Joel Michaely is an American actor and film producer.

He has appeared in such films as Can't Hardly Wait, But I'm a Cheerleader, Ghost World, The Rules of Attraction, Kiss Kiss Bang Bang, Cruel World, Factory Girl, Itty Bitty Titty Committee, The Comeback Trail (2020 film), Vanquish (film), and Lansky (2021 film). On television, Michaely has appeared in Unhappily Ever After, Sabrina the Teenage Witch and Popular. He produced the 2005 film The Quiet, is the executive producer of Farewell Amor and executive producer of Wild Indian which premiered at the 2021 Sundance Film Festival.

Selected filmography
 Can't Hardly Wait (1998) as Geoff, X-Phile No. 1
 But I'm a Cheerleader (1999) as Joel Goldberg
 Ghost World (2001) as Porno Cashier
 The Rules of Attraction (2002) as Raymond
 Wonderland (2003) as Bruce (scenes deleted)
 Kiss Kiss Bang Bang (2005) as Eugene
 Cruel World (2005) as Jack
 Factory Girl (2006) as Joey
 The Still Life (2006) as Robert
 Itty Bitty Titty Committee (2007) as Peter
 I Am Michael (2015) as co-producer
 Carrie Pilby (2016) as George
 Farewell Amor (2020) as Aubrey
 Run Hide Fight (2020) as Mr. Yates
 The Comeback Trail (2020 film) (2020) as Andre
 You Are My Home (2020) as Charlie
 Love-40 (2020) as Anthony
 Wild Indian (2021) as Jonathan
 Me You Madness (2021) as Pat
 Vanquish (film) (2021) as Rayo
 Lansky (2021 film) (2021) as Jimmy the Bookie
 The Card Counter (2021) as Ronnie
 Bittersweet (2021) as Spinoza
 Mutt (2023) as producer
 The Re-Education of Molly Singer (TBA)

References

External links

Living people
Year of birth missing (living people)
American male film actors
American film producers
American male television actors
American male voice actors